Louis Sylvestre Radegonde is a Seychellois diplomat and politician. He serves as the Minister for Foreign Affairs and Tourism since 3 November 2020. Prior to his appointment as Minister, Radegonde had served as high commissioner and ambassador to a multitude of countries.

Biography
Radegonde started his diplomatic career in 1976. He served as High Commissioner to the United Kingdom, Malaysia and Ambassador to Belgium. In 2005, Radegonde joined the office of President, and became CEO of the Tourist Office. In 2007, he started to work for the DHL Clinical Trials Logistics.

In 2017, Radegonde was appointed Ambassador to France. In 2018, he was also appointed as non-resident Ambassador to Monaco, and in 2019 appointed non-resident Ambassador to Russia as well.

On 3 November 2020, it was announced that Radegonde was appointed Minister of Foreign Affairs and Tourism, and will be sworn in after his COVID-19 quarantine.

References

Date of birth missing (living people)
Living people
Foreign Ministers of Seychelles
Tourism ministers of Seychelles
Ambassadors of Seychelles to Belgium
Ambassadors of Seychelles to France
Ambassadors of Seychelles to Monaco
Ambassadors of Seychelles to Russia
High Commissioners of Seychelles to Malaysia
High Commissioners of Seychelles to the United Kingdom
Year of birth missing (living people)